The 1987 PBA Reinforced Conference Finals was the best-of-7 series basketball championship of the 1987 PBA Reinforced Conference, and the conclusion of the conference playoffs. The San Miguel Beermen and Hills Bros. Coffee Kings played for the 38th championship contested by the league.

San Miguel Beermen wins their third PBA title and its first championship in five years, defeating Hills Bros. Coffee Kings in their finals series, 4 games to 1.

Qualification

Series scoring summary

Games summary

Game 1

The Coffee Kings squeeze out the best from import Jose Slaughter and Yoyoy Villamin, who scored 34 points, the highest for a local in this conference, to roll back San Miguel Beermen. Slaughter refused to succumb to the pressure when the Beermen threatened at 95–98 in the closing two minutes. Four straight points from Slaughter and charities by Frankie Lim and Tim Coloso sealed the win, 105–95, with 28 seconds to go.

Game 2

Down 26–27, the Beermen immediately blazed away from all angles to open up a 50–36 lead before taking the first 24 minutes of play at 59–42. Bobby Parks and Abet Guidaben combined to stretch the lead to 22 points in the third quarter at 77–55.

Game 3

The Beermen limited the Coffee Kings to only 11 points in the second quarter en route to a 58–39 halftime lead. Hills Bros badly missed the services of Marte Saldana on a twisted left knee ligament, Ricky Relosa on a left hand bone fracture and Bogs Adornado. Coffee Kings coach Arturo Valenzona had to field in seldom used Teddy Alfarero, Dennis Abbatuan and Adonis Tierra. There was no stopping the Beermen as they led by as many as 31 points, 87–56.

Game 4

Ricky Relosa suited up for Game four but the Coffee Kings efforts were not enough in stopping the Beermen from taking a 3–1 series lead. Hills Bros was in the thick of the fight until the final minute of the ballgame.

Game 5

Hector Calma, Bobby Parks and Abet Guidaben combined to open up a 30–18 lead before the Beermen took the half at 50–44. The Coffee Kings, undaunted by injuries to their key men, refused to give up easily and levelled the count five times, the last at 75-all, but the Beermen unloaded a crippling 17–2 blast to break the backs of the Coffee Kings and led, 92–77, with 2:23 to go. Bobby Parks put on the final icing of their title triumph with a buzzer-beating jumper.

Rosters

Broadcast notes

References

1987
1987 PBA season
San Miguel Beermen games
Alaska Aces (PBA) games
PBA All-Filipino Conference Finals